The 2012 Farmers Classic Doubles was a men's tennis tournament played on outdoor hard courts in Los Angeles, California.

Ernests Gulbis was the defending champion, but chose not to participate.

Sam Querrey won the title, defeating Ričardas Berankis in the final, 6–0, 6–2. This was Querrey's third title at the event.

Seeds
The top four seeds receive a bye into the second round.

Draw

Finals

Top half

Bottom half

Qualifying

Seeds

Qualifiers

Draw

First qualifier

Second qualifier

Third qualifier

Fourth qualifier

External links
 Main draw
 Qualifying draw

2012 ATP World Tour
2012 Singles